Paola Barbato (born 18 June 1971) is an Italian  writer of comics and novels. She is part of the writing staff of the Italian comic book Dylan Dog, published by Sergio Bonelli Editore.

Career

Born in Milan, Barbato is part of the writing staff of Dylan Dog, an Italian comic, published by Sergio Bonelli Editore.

She has published three novels published by Rizzoli. She has also published Graphic novels, released by Bonelli.

She co-wrote for Filmmaster fiction In the Name of Evil with Fabrizio Bentivoglio, broadcast on Sky Channel in June 2009. In 2011 she debuted with an Italian comic-style shojo manga.

In 2012, she wrote the script for Il boia di Parigi, the first issue of the new series by Bonelli. The story is drawn by Giampiero Casertano.

Besides writing, Barbato is involved in social activities and philanthropy as president of Mauro Emolo, a non-governmental organisation that deals with people suffering from Huntington's Chorea.

Bibliography

Novels
Bilico (Rizzoli,2006)
Mani nude (Rizzoli,2008)
Il filo rosso (Rizzoli, 2010)

Comic books
 Dylan Dog n. 157 – Il sonno della ragione  (1999)
 Dylan Dog n. 163 – Il mondo perfetto (with Tiziano Sclavi) (2000)
 Dylan Dog n. 167 – Medusa
 Dylan Dog n. 169 – Lo specchio dell'anima
 Dylan Dog n. 172 – Memorie dal sottosuolo
 Dylan Dog n. 175 – Il seme della follia     (2001)
 Dylan Dog n. 183 – Requiem per un mostro
 Dylan Dog n. 185 – Phobia                   (2002)
 Dylan Dog n. 189 – Il prezzo della morte
 Dylan Dog n. 191 – Sciarada
 Dylan Dog n. 200 – Il numero duecento       (2003)
 Dylan Dog n. 202 – Il settimo girone
 Dylan Dog n. 206 – Nebbia
 Dylan Dog n. 210 – Il pifferaio magico      (2004)
 Dylan Dog n. 212 – Necropolis
 Dylan Dog n. 221 – Il tocco del diavolo     (2005)
 Dylan Dog n. 228 – Oltre quella porta
 Dylan Dog n. 234 – L'ultimo arcano          (2006)
 Dylan Dog n. 241 – Xabaras
 Dylan Dog n. 242 – In nome del padre
 Dylan Dog n. 245 –  Il cimitero dei freaks   (2007)
 Dylan Dog n. 279 –  Il giardino delle illusioni   (2009)
 Dylan Dog n. 292 –  Anime prigioniere       (2011)
 Dylan Dog n. 296 –  La seconda occasione       (2011)
 Dylan Dog n. 313 −  Il Crollo
 Dylan Dog n. 338 −  Ma più, ispettore Bloch
 Dylan Dog n. 346 −  ...E cenere tornerai
 Dylan Dog n. 347 −  Gli abbandonati
 Dylan Dog n. 349 −  La morta non dimentica
 Dylan Dog n. 355 −  L'uomo dei tuoi segni
 Dylan Dog n. 360 −  Remington House
 Dylan Dog n. 363 −  Cose perdute
 Dylan Dog n. 372 −  Il bianco e il nero
 Dylan Dog n. 380 −  Nessuno è innocente
 Dylan Dog n. 388 −  Esercizio numero 6
 Dylan Dog n. 390 −  La caduta degli dei
 Dylan Dog n. 391 −  Il sangue della terra
 Dylan Dog n. 392 −  Il primordio
 Dylan Dog n. 394 −  Eterne stagioni
 Dylan Dog n. 397 −  Morbo M
 Dylan Dog n. 398 −  Chi muore si rivede
 Allegato a Dylan Dog Albo Speciale n. 12 – "Il cavaliere di sventura"
 Dylan Dog Albo Speciale n. 18  – La Scelta
 Dylan Dog Albo Speciale n. 19 – La Peste
 Dylan Dog Albo Speciale n. 24 – Il santuario
 Dylan Dog Almanacco della paura 2001 – Qualcuno nell'ombra
 Dylan Dog Albo Gigante n. 13 – Il senza nome
 Dylan Dog Albo Gigante n. 15 – La lunga note
 Dylan Dog Albo Gigante n. 16/4 – Il dogma
 Dylan Dog Albo Gigante n. 18/3 – Tueentoun
 Dylan Dog Maxi n. 4/1 – L'esodo
 Dylan Dog Maxi n. 6/1 – Il capobranco
 Dylan Dog Color Fest n. 2/2 – Videokiller
 Dylan Dog Color Fest n. 6/3 – La predatrice
 Series "Le Storie" – n.1 "Il boia di Parigi"
 Davvero n. 1 – Cambiamenti
 Davvero n. 2 – Troppi cambiamenti
 Davvero n. 3 – Scherzare col fuoco

Graphic novels

 Romanzo a fumetti Bonelli n. 3 – "Sighma" (2008)
 Romanzo a fumetti Bonelli n. 7 – "Darwin" (2012)

References

External links 

  
 Official website of Sergio Bonelli Editore 

Italian comics writers
21st-century Italian novelists
Writers from Milan
1971 births
Living people
Italian women novelists
21st-century Italian women writers
Female comics writers